Samir Jain (born 11 March 1954) is an Indian publisher and the Vice-Chairman and Managing Director (VCMD) of Bennett, Coleman & Co. Ltd., also known as The Times Group, a leading media conglomerate with its primary base of operations in India, which publishes The Times of India and has many other interests. Jain belongs to the Sahu Jain family, an industrialist family of India.

Career
In 1975, Samir joined Bennett, Coleman & Co. Ltd.
During his time, The Times of India has become the largest circulating English newspaper in the world.

References

Further reading
Auletta, Ken: "Citizens Jain – Why India's Newspaper Industry is Thriving". The New Yorker, 8 October 2012, Pages 52 to 61.
Subramanian, Samanth : "Supreme Being : How Samir Jain created the modern Indian Newspaper Industry", Caravan Magazine, 1 December 2012.
Menon Malhan, Sangita P, "The TOI Story: How a Newspaper Changed the Rules of the Game" (2013) HarperCollins India

External links
 Indiatimes Times of India

1954 births
Living people
Businesspeople from Delhi
Indian newspaper publishers (people)
Indian mass media owners
Indian billionaires
The Times Group people
20th-century Indian businesspeople